Sabatia angularis, commonly called rosepink, rose pink, or rose gentain is a biennial flowering plant in the Gentianaceae (gentain) family. It is native to central and eastern North America.

Description
In the second year, one or more stems rise from the basal leaves. The stems are 4-sided, appearing as a square in cross section, and glabrous, with flexible, thin wings on the edges. The lower part of the main stem is unbranched, with branches growing primarily from leaf nodes on the upper part.

The flowers have 5 petal-like obovate lobes. Yellowish triangular markings on the inner edge of the lobes give the appearance of a star in the middle of the flower. After the flowers fade, the plant produces seed capsules that contain numerous tiny seeds. Seeds are spread by the wind, and the plant will reseed itself.

Etymology
The genus name honors Liberato Sabbati, and 18th century Italian botanist. The specific epithet is Latin for "angular", referring to the square stems.

Distribution and habitat
It is geographically widespread in the United States, in the southern U.S. from Arizona in the west all the way to the east coast, and in the northern U.S. from Illinois in the west to Massachusetts in the east. It is native to Ontario but it is believed to be extirpated.

S. angularis is found in a variety of habitats, in glades, along roadsides, in fields, and along the margins of woods.

References

angularis
Flora of the United States
Plants described in 1753
Taxa named by Carl Linnaeus